Ramón Romero Roa (3 April 1966 – 23 June 2021) was a Paraguayan politician.

Biography
He was born in Minga Guazú, and served as a member of the Chamber of Deputies of Paraguay from 2013 till his death from COVID-19 on 23 June 2021 in Asunción during the COVID-19 pandemic in Paraguay.

References

1966 births
2021 deaths
Paraguayan politicians
Colorado Party (Paraguay) politicians
Universidad Católica Nuestra Señora de la Asunción alumni
People from Alto Paraná Department
Deaths from the COVID-19 pandemic in Paraguay